Football Bartar (meaning Premier Football) is an Iranian live football television program, The match broadcast program is usually broadcast on Esteghlal, Persepolis and the Iran national football team match day, 30 minutes before the start of the match and the analytical program airs every Monday night on IRIB TV3. Produced by Mehdi Hashemi and presented by Mohammad Hossein Misaghi, the program explores what is happening around Iran's football. The program usually covers the Persian Gulf Pro League matches, the Iranian Hazfi Cup, the Iranian Super Cup, the AFC Champions League matches and the Iran national football team matches.

Every episode typically feature three Referee Expert. they discuss the referee's decisions and errors. On some shows, famous football players are invited and interview as well. This television program replaces the Navad.

The first episode of the analytical program was broadcast on 31 March 2019 for the 90th Tehran Derby special program.

History 
Football Bartar was founded in 2001 by Mehdi Hashemi. The first episode of the program aired on 2 November 2001. Since 31 March 2019, Football Bartar analytical program has aired on the IRIB TV3.

Attributes

Broadcast 
The Football Bartar match broadcast program is usually broadcast on Esteghlal, Persepolis and the Iran national football team match day.  The Football Bartar analytical program airs every Monday at approximately 22:30.

Presenter 
The program is presented by Mohammad Hossein Misaghi. Javad Khiabani, Peyman Yousefi and Mazdak Mirzaei were former Football Bartar broadcast program presenter.

External links
 Official website

References

Islamic Republic of Iran Broadcasting original programming
Iranian television shows
Association football television series
2019 Iranian television series debuts
2010s Iranian television series
Persian-language television shows
Criticism of sports